Heather A. Harrington (born 1984) is an applied mathematician interested in dynamical systems, chemical reaction network theory, topological data analysis, and systems biology. She is professor of mathematics, and Royal Society University Research Fellow at the Mathematical Institute, University of Oxford, where she heads the Algebraic Systems Biology group.

Education and career
Harrington went to Concord-Carlisle High School in Massachusetts. As an applied mathematics student at the University of Massachusetts Amherst she won a Barry M. Goldwater Scholarship, and graduated summa cum laude from in 2006. She completed her Ph.D. in 2010 at Imperial College London. Her dissertation, Mathematical models of cellular decisions, was jointly supervised by Jaroslav Stark and Dorothy Buck.

After postdoctoral research in theoretical systems biology at Imperial from 2010 to 2013, she joined the Mathematical Institute at Oxford as Hooke Research Fellow and EPSRC Postdoctoral Research Fellow, and as Junior Research Fellow at St Cross College, Oxford. In 2017, she became an associate professor and Royal Society University Research Fellow at Oxford. In 2020, she became professor of mathematics.

She is a board member of the EDGE Foundation (Enhancing Diversity in Graduate Education).

Recognition
In 2018 Harrington was one of the winners of the Whitehead Prize of the London Mathematical Society. She was a co-winner of the 2019 Adams Prize of the University of Cambridge, which had the topic 'The Mathematics of Networks'. She was awarded the Philip Leverhulme Prize in 2020 for advances in analysis of noisy data.

References

External links
Home page

1984 births
Living people
Women mathematicians
University of Massachusetts Amherst alumni
Alumni of Imperial College London
Academics of the University of Oxford
Whitehead Prize winners